William White, Q.C. (April 29, 1856 – May 9, 1953) was a Canadian politician. He served on the 1st Council of the Northwest Territories for Regina from 1883 to 1885.

White was born in 1856 at Hamilton, Ontario, the son of Thomas White. After receiving education at the Upper Canada College and the University of Toronto, he became a lawyer. Though he served on the Northwest Territories Council as an independent as it was non-partisan, White affiliated himself later with the Conservative Party of Canada. He would practice law at Moosomin where he was also a prosecutor. He later moved to British Columbia, Yukon and England. In 1887, he married Frances Louisa Cholerton-Hall.

He was elected in 1883 to the Council of the North West Territories, and retired at the next election, in 1885.

Electoral results

1883 election

References

1856 births
1953 deaths
Politicians from Hamilton, Ontario
Members of the Executive Council of the Northwest Territories
Upper Canada College alumni
University of Toronto alumni
Conservative Party of Canada (1867–1942) politicians